Gooramadda is a locality in north east Victoria, Australia.

Gooramadda played Australian Rules Football in the Chiltern & District Football Association in 1920 and 1921.
 

References

External links

Towns in Victoria (Australia)
Shire of Indigo